Karl Adolf Langberg (1850–1889) was a Norwegian civil servant and politician.  He served as the County Governor of Finnmarken county from 1886 until 1889.

References

1850 births
1889 deaths
County governors of Norway